Maria Teresa "Tere" Marichal Lugo, (born May 24, 1956) better known as her character Maria Chuzema is a Puerto Rican actress, writer, ventriloquist, playwright and television personality. For 25 years starting in 1987, her television show, *La Casa de Maria Chuzema", was shown on Puerto Rico's government channel, the PBS-affiliated Canal 6.

Biography
Marichal was born in Yauco, Puerto Rico, the daughter of a Spaniard named Carlos Marichal, who was an artist and scenographer, and mother Flavia Lugo, a schoolteacher and radio show writer.

During 2018, Marichal revealed that she had suffered domestic violence at a point in her life.

Health issues
During June of 2020, Marichal told Puerto Rican newspaper El Vocero that she had recuperated from a bout with the coronavirus. Her son, Miguel, who was, as of 2020, incarcerated at the Federal Correctional Institution, Fort Dix in New Jersey, United States, also suffered from that disease.

Awards
For her work, Marichal has been awarded two Emmy's as well as the "René Marqués Award", which she won for her play, "La Obra de los Dioses" ("The Work of the Gods").

Writings
As of 2020, Marichal had written some 31 books that have been published, both in Spanish and in English.

See also
List of Puerto Ricans
Luis Oliva (Puerto Rican actor)

External links

1956 births
Living people
20th-century Puerto Rican actresses
21st-century Puerto Rican actresses
Puerto Rican writers
People from San Juan, Puerto Rico
People from Yauco, Puerto Rico
Puerto Rican people of Spanish descent